Palo Alto Stock Farm Horse Barn, also known as Stanford Red Barn or Stanford Stables, is located at present-day address 100 Electioneer Road in Stanford, California. This barn was established c.1878-1880 and is an example of Victorian-era Stick-Eastlake style architecture, though the architect is unknown. Palo Alto Stock Farm Horse Barn has been listed on the National Register of Historic Places since 1985. There are only two original buildings left from the Palo Alto Stock Farm: the red barn and the brick stable.

History 
Leland Stanford bought the Mayfield Grange property in 1876, approximately 650 acres along San Francisquito Creek. In the following years, Stanford acquired about 8,000 acres of land in the surrounding area. The red barn was the center of the stock farm in the early years, and additionally there was a carriage house, a colt barn and a training barn. In the 21st century, there are only two original buildings left from the Palo Alto Stock Farm, the red barn and the brick stable.

From 1878 to 1880 the barn served as a training stable for the stock farm. In 1877 the stallion Electioneer was brought to the barn and lived there for 14 years, in order to breed and train faster horses. One of the early innovations to come from the farm included a "school" to train 5-month-old colts to trot around a small track to encourage this behavior. Stanford advocated co-educational universities during a time when this was not a popular idea; this may have been partially based on his observing at the barn the relationship of the mother of a colt being trained and its effect on teaching her offspring properly, suggesting the importance of the first five years in a child's development and the need for an educated mother.

In c.1877, photographer Eadweard Muybridge's series of stop-action photographs of horses running Sallie Gardner at a Gallop was photographed at Palo Alto Stock Farm. In order to take the photograph, Muybridge built a stage with 24 cameras with a trip wire and discover galloping horses did momentarily have all four hooves leave the ground. This discovery was a precursor to the technology for the motion picture industry.

By 1903 the farm was closed and the horses sold in order to maintain the university, though by 1946, university president Donald Tresidder reopened the building for equestrian use. In the mid-1980s, the barn became the home of Stanford University's equestrian team. In 1985, L.W. “Bill” Lane, Jr. and their family donated a statue of Electioneer, currently located in the entrance to the equestrian center. In 1983 and in 2004 there were large restorations and renovations of the barn done while maintaining much of the original material, this funded by L.W. “Bill” Lane, Jr. and John Arrillaga.

See also 

 National Register of Historic Places listings in Santa Clara County, California

References

External links 

 Stanford University Equestrian Center and Team

1880s architecture in the United States
Houses on the National Register of Historic Places in California
Stanford University places